The 1955 Toledo Rockets football team was an American football team that represented Toledo University in the Mid-American Conference (MAC) during the 1955 college football season. In their second and final season under head coach Forrest England, the Rockets compiled a 3–5–1 record (2–4 against MAC opponents), finished in fifth place in the MAC, and were outscored by their opponents by a combined total of 213 to 77.

The team's statistical leaders included Sam Tisci with 404 passing yards, Julius Taormina with 449 rushing yards, and Gene Cook with 230 receiving yards.

Schedule

References

Toledo
Toledo Rockets football seasons
Toledo Rockets football